Fadi Alloush (born 1 January 1969) is a Lebanese former footballer. Nicknamed "the Bulldozer", Alloush played as a striker for Ansar for most of his career.

He is famous for holding the record for most goals in a Lebanese Premier League campaign, with 32 goals in the 1990–91 season. Alloush is also the highest all-time scorer in the Lebanese Premier League, scoring 120 official league goals.

Club career

Ansar 
In the 1990–91 season Alloush scored 32 goals, becoming the player to have scored the most goals in a single Lebanese Premier League season. The next season Alloush scored 18, missing out on the Golden Boot to Walid Dahrouj who scored 20 goals. In the 1992–93 season he became the top scorer for a second time with 27 goals, becoming the first player to win the Lebanese Premier League Golden Boot more than once.

Akhaa Ahli Aley and Homenmen 
In 1997, Alloush signed for Akhaa Ahli Aley after having played for Ansar for 12 years; he scored two goals for them. Alloush ended his career at Homenmen, scoring two goals and bringing his total league tally to a record 120 goals.

International career
Alloush represented the Lebanon national team. One of his goals was against Hong Kong in the 1994 World Cup qualifiers, scoring a 79th minute penalty. He also scored a 32nd-minute goal against Kazakhstan in a friendly in 1996.

Personal life 
Alloush's daughter, Hiba, also plays football; she represented Lebanon internationally at senior level. As of July 2019, Alloush is working in a Lebanese bank, and is a supervisor for the women's department of the Lebanese Football Association.

Career statistics

International 
Scores and results list Lebanon's goal tally first, score column indicates score after each Alloush goal.

Honours 
Ansar
 Lebanese Premier League: 1987–88, 1989–90, 1990–91, 1991–92, 1992–93, 1993–94, 1994–95, 1995–96, 1996–97
 Lebanese FA Cup: 1987–88, 1989–90, 1990–91, 1991–92, 1993–94, 1994–95, 1995–96
 Lebanese Super Cup: 1996

Homenmen
 Lebanese Elite Cup: 1999

Individual
 Lebanese Premier League top goalscorer: 1990–91, 1992–93

Records
 Most goals in Lebanese Premier League history: 120 goals
 Most Lebanese Premier League goals in a single season: 32 goals

See also 
 List of association football families

Notes

References

External links
 
 

1969 births
Lebanese footballers
Association football forwards
Living people
Lebanon international footballers
Lebanese Premier League players
Al Ansar FC players
Akhaa Ahli Aley FC players
Homenmen Beirut players
Footballers from Beirut
Lebanese Premier League top scorers